The 2022 Tandridge District Council election took place on 5 May 2022 to elect members of Tandridge District Council in Surrey, England. One third of the council was up for election and the council remained in no overall control.

Election result

Ward results

Bletchingley and Nutfield

Burstow, Horne & Outwood

Dormansland & Felcourt

Godstone

Harestone

Limpsfield

Lingfield & Crowhurst

Oxted North & Tandridge

Oxted South

Queens Park

Warlingham East, Chelsham & Farleigh

Warlingham West

Westway

Whyteleafe

References

Tandridge
Tandridge District Council elections